Nile.JPG|thumb|right|Four Seasons Hotel in Cairo]]

This is a list of the tallest buildings and structures in Egypt. 

Egypt is one of the largest tourist destinations in the world, which generates a large percentage of its GDP. Cairo's skyline is one of the most densely packed in Africa and continues to grow.

It became the tallest building in Africa in October 2020 after surpassing 250 meters and is expected to fully completed in 2022.

The tallest structure in Egypt is the Iconic Tower of the New Administrative Capital with 250 meters (820 ft) out of 393.8 meters (1,266 ft) already built as of October 2020.

Tallest structures

This includes spires, architectural details and antenna masts.

Tallest under construction

Under construction, approved, and proposed

See also

 List of tallest buildings and structures in South Africa
 List of tallest structures in the world by country
 List of tallest buildings in South Africa
 List of World Heritage Sites in Africa
 List of tallest buildings in Africa

References

 
Egypt
Egypt
Tallest